Akram Umarov (born 7 February 1994) is a Kyrgyzstani footballer who plays as defender.

International career
He is a member of the Kyrgyzstan national football team. He made his debut in the match vs. Kazakhstan, held on 1 June 2012.

Career statistics

International

Statistics accurate as of match played 1 June 2012

References

External links
 
 

1994 births
Living people
Kyrgyzstani footballers
Kyrgyzstan international footballers
Kyrgyzstani expatriate footballers
Expatriate footballers in Belarus
Kyrgyzstani expatriate sportspeople in Belarus
FC Abdysh-Ata Kant players
FC Krumkachy Minsk players
FC Alay players
Association football defenders
Footballers at the 2014 Asian Games
Asian Games competitors for Kyrgyzstan